The 1903 UCI Track Cycling World Championships were the World Championship for track cycling. They took place in Copenhagen, Denmark from 16 to 22 August 1903. Four events for men were contested, two for professionals and two for amateurs.

Medal summary

Medal table

References

Track cycling
UCI Track Cycling World Championships by year
International sports competitions in Copenhagen
International cycle races hosted by Denmark
1903 in track cycling
August 1903 sports events
1903 in Copenhagen